Soudabeh Bagherpour (Persian: سودابه باقرپور, born 16 September 1990 in Babol) is an Iranian volleyball player who plays for the Iran women's national volleyball team.

She won the title of the best defender on the tour in the World Cup qualifiers in Central Asia along with Farnoosh Sheikhi. She played for the teams of Azad University and Peykan Tehran and is also the runner-up in the Iranian Premier League.

References

1990 births
Living people
Iranian women's volleyball players
People from Babol
Sportspeople from Mazandaran province